The Six Days' Adventure; Or, The New Utopia is a 1671 comedy play by the English writer Edward Howard. First performed by the Duke's Company at the Lincoln's Inn Fields Theatre in London, the original cast included Cave Underhill as  Sir Adam Meridith, Matthew Medbourne as Sir Grave Solymour, Henry Harris as Sir Franckman, John Crosby as Featlin, John Young as Polidor, James Nokes as Foppering, Edward Angel as  Peacock, Samuel Sandford as Orlando Curioso, Mary Betterton as Serina, Anne Shadwell as Celinda, Jane Long as Crispina, Elinor Dixon as Petilla and Mary Lee as Eugenia.

References

Bibliography
 Van Lennep, W. The London Stage, 1660-1800: Volume One, 1660-1700. Southern Illinois University Press, 1960.

1671 plays
West End plays
Comedy plays
Plays by Edward Howard